Move Again is the eighth extended play released by the South Korean girl group Kara, released on November 29, 2022 through RBW, marketed as their "15th Anniversary Special Album". The EP marks their first release since their disbandment in 2016, their first to feature Nicole and Jiyoung since their departure in 2014, and their first to be released following the death of member Hara in November 2019. A Japanese version of the album released on December 21.

Background
On September 19, 2022, it was announced that Kara would be releasing an album under RBW to commemorate the 15th anniversary of their debut in November, featuring the return of members Nicole and Jiyoung after their departure in April 2014. The album's official title and release date were revealed on October 18.

On November 11, it was confirmed the group had finished filming their comeback MV. On November 14, the group's full comeback schedule was released to Twitter.

Promotion
Kara held their first comeback stage at the 2022 MAMA Awards. The group will also hold fan meetings in Fukuoka, Yokohama, etc. starting in Osaka, Japan on February 23, 2023.

Accolades

Track listing

Charts

Weekly charts

Monthly charts

References

2022 EPs
Korean-language EPs
Kara (South Korean group) EPs